BYK is a globally operating supplier of additives and measuring instruments.

The areas of application of BYK additives include the coatings, inks, plastics and oil/gas industries, the manufacture of care products, the manufacture of adhesives and sealants, and construction chemistry. The instruments section (BYK-Gardner GmbH) develops measuring instruments for evaluating the color, appearance and physical properties of coatings, plastics and paper surfaces.  BYK is one of four Divisions within the ALTANA Group.

BYK Additives & Instruments employs around 2,300 people worldwide, approx. 850 of whom work in Wesel. In 2019, according to company figures, sales totaled about 1 billion euros. Around 90% of sales are generated abroad, particularly in neighboring European countries, the USA and the Asian market.

History 
In 1873 Heinrich Byk founded a chemicals factory in Berlin under his name, in which he initially produced soporific drugs. In 1917 the firm merged with the dye and tanning works to form Byk-Guldenwerke AG; the photochemical factory Ernst Lomberg was acquired subsequently. The first BYK additive for coatings came on the market in 1935. It enabled pigments to be distributed evenly in coatings. In 1962 BYK established the site in Wesel, where it commenced production of paint and plastics additives.

BYK has production sites in Germany (Wesel, Kempen, Moosburg an der Isar, Schkopau and Geretsried), in the Netherlands (Deventer, Njiverdal and Denekamp), in Great Britain (Widnes), in the US (Wallingford, Chester, Gonzales, Louisville, Earth City and Pompano Beach) and in China (Tongling).

Research and development 
BYK invests around 8% of turnover each year in research and development – this is more than double the amount customary in the sector.

References

External links 
 

Companies established in 1873
Companies based in North Rhine-Westphalia
Chemical companies of Germany
Wesel (district)